L7 is the debut studio album by American rock band L7, released in 1988 by Epitaph Records. It demonstrates the band's punk rock origins, although there are traces of the heavier grunge sound that dominated their later work.

Production
The album was recorded in Brett Gurewitz's studio, in Hollywood, California. It is the band's only album with drummer Roy Koutsky.

The album's first track, "Bite the Wax Tadpole," refers to the legend that this is a Chinese transliteration of "Coca-Cola."

Critical reception
Trouser Press wrote that the album "is a heady but largely inconsequential introduction; it’s all brute force and speed, grunge as a sheer sonic description."

Track listing

Personnel
L7
Donita Sparks – vocals, guitar
Suzi Gardner – guitar, vocals
Jennifer Finch – bass guitar, vocals
Roy Koutsky – drums

Productions
Brett Gurewitz – producer
Jordan Tarlow – guitar technician
Suzy Beal – artwork
Donnell Cameron – engineer
Jeff Campbell – CD layout
Al Flipside – photography, cover photo
Bruce Kalberg 	photography
Randall Martin – logo
Eddy Schreyer – mastering
N.Todd Skiles – design

References 

L7 (band) albums
1988 debut albums
Epitaph Records albums